Carol Starks is a British actress.

She studied at the Central School of Speech and Drama, and landed her first role with the National Theatre in Sweeney Todd. She later found wider audiences through her ongoing role in the soap opera Family Affairs, playing nurse Tanya Woods from 2003 to 2005. Other appearances include the BBC film Dustbin Baby, the 1992 TV serial The Guilty, in which she co-starred with Michael Kitchen, the Masterpiece Theatre film Reckless, The Sequel''', ITV's - The Bill and TV film Red Cap.
Amy Wakes in Casualty series 19 episode 25. She also appeared as Jane Folley in the episode Deadly Slumber (series 7, episode 1) of the ITV series Inspector Morse''.

References

External links
 

British actresses
Alumni of the Royal Central School of Speech and Drama
Living people
Year of birth missing (living people)